Vasily Ivanovich may refer to:

Vasily Ivanovich Chapayev, a Russian Civil War hero and a butt of numerous Russian jokes
Vasily Ivanovich of Ryazan, Grand Prince of Ryazan
Vasili III Ivanovich, Grand Prince of Moscow
Vasili IV of Russia (Vasily Ivánovich Shúyskiy)

See also

Vasily Ivanov
Vasily (disambiguation)
Ivanovich